Parliamentary elections were held in Vietnam on 20 May 2007.

Results

Aftermath
Following the elections, incumbent president Nguyễn Minh Triết was re-elected by the new National Assembly on 24 July 2007 with 98.78% of the votes.

References

Elections in Vietnam
Vietnam
Legislative
Election and referendum articles with incomplete results